Sapphire is a saturated shade of blue, referring to the gem of the same name. Sapphire gems are most commonly found in a range of blue shades although they can be many different colors.  Other names for variations of the color sapphire are blue sapphire or sapphire blue, shown below.

Sapphire

Displayed at right is the color sapphire.

The first recorded use of sapphire as a color name in English was in 1430.

Variations

Sapphire blue

At right is displayed the color sapphire blue.

Medium sapphire

Medium sapphire is the color called sapphire in Crayola Gem Tones, a specialty set of Crayola crayons introduced in 1994.

B'dazzled blue

B'dazzled blue is a color in Crayola Metallic FX, a specialty set of Crayola crayons introduced in 2001.

Blue sapphire

Displayed as right is the color blue sapphire.

The source of this color is the Pantone Textile Paper Extended (TPX) color list color #18-4231 "Blue Sapphire".

King blue

Displayed as right is the color king blue, a variant of sapphire with a violet tone.

Dark sapphire

Dark sapphire is a dark tone of sapphire.

In culture

Alcoholic beverages
 Bombay Sapphire is a popular brand of gin. It comes in a pale sapphire colored glass bottle.

Given names
 Sapphire is a given name for females.

Music
 The color 'Pearl Sapphire Blue' is the official color of the popular K-pop band Super Junior.

Religion
 In the Old Testament of the Bible, in the Book of Ezekiel, it is stated that God sits upon a sapphire throne in Heaven.

Television
 In an episode of the science fiction TV show Sliders, the protagonists go to an alternate universe where the Golden Gate Bridge is colored sapphire and is referred to as the Sapphire Gate Bridge.
 Sapphire is a character in the animated TV series Steven Universe. She has a sapphire gemstone on her left palm.

See also
List of colors

References

Shades of blue